The Gambaga flycatcher (Muscicapa gambagae) is a species of bird in the family Muscicapidae.
It is found in Burkina Faso, Cameroon, Central African Republic, Chad, Democratic Republic of the Congo, Ivory Coast, Djibouti, Ethiopia, Ghana, Guinea, Kenya, Liberia, Mali, Nigeria, Saudi Arabia, Somalia, Sudan, Togo, Uganda, and Yemen.
Its natural habitats are subtropical or tropical dry forests, dry savanna, and subtropical or tropical dry shrubland.

References

Gambaga flycatcher
Birds of Sub-Saharan Africa
Birds of the Middle East
Gambaga flycatcher
Taxonomy articles created by Polbot